Yogi's Space Race is a 90-minute American animated television series and the third entry in the Yogi Bear franchise. Thirteen episodes were broadcast on NBC from September 9, 1978, to December 2, 1978, and featured the following four segments, which is parodied logo of Star Wars:

 Yogi's Space Race: Yogi Bear, Huckleberry Hound, Jabberjaw and several new characters participating in intergalactic racing competitions.
 Galaxy Goof-Ups: Yogi Bear, Scare Bear, Huckleberry Hound, and Quack-Up as four intergalactic police officers.
 The Buford Files: Buford is a sleepy bloodhound who solves mysteries in Fenokee County with two teenagers named Cindy Mae and Woody.
 The Galloping Ghost: Nugget Nose is a ghost miner who is a guardian to Wendy and Rita at the Fuddy Dude Ranch.

When Galaxy Goof-Ups was given its own half-hour timeslot on November 4, 1978, Yogi's Space Race was reduced to 60 minutes. In early 1979, the Space Race segment was also spun off in its own half-hour series from February 3 to March 3, 1979. The series was later aired in reruns on USA Cartoon Express, Nickelodeon, Cartoon Network, and Boomerang.

Yogi's Space Race was referenced in Jellystone!

Overview
The show featured Yogi Bear, Huckleberry Hound, Jabberjaw and several new characters as competitors in an outer space reworking of Wacky Races. Cameo guests included Fred Flintstone, Barney Rubble, Quick Draw McGraw, Grape Ape, Frankenstein Jr. and Jana of the Jungle; the supporting segments were Galaxy Goof-Ups, The Buford Files and The Galloping Ghost. The latter two were repackaged the following year as Buford and the Galloping Ghost. When Galaxy Goof-Ups was given its own half-hour timeslot on November 4, 1978, Yogi's Space Race was reduced to 60 minutes. On February 3, 1979, the Space Race segment and Buford and the Galloping Ghost were also spun off in their own half-hour series.

Characters
 Yogi Bear (voiced by Daws Butler) and Scare Bear (voiced by Joe Besser): While Yogi remains unchanged save for the change in setting, his friend Boo Boo does not appear and was unable to participate in the race. Instead, his companion and partner is Scare Bear, a small fuzzy bear who is afraid of almost everything. Yogi and Scare are a racing team on "Space Race" and members of the "Galaxy Goof-Ups".
 Huckleberry Hound (voiced by Daws Butler) and Quack-Up (voiced by Mel Blanc): Quack-Up is a duck who is the crazy and clumsy pilot of the team while Huck just rests at the top of their ship. They are also members of the "Galaxy Goof-Ups".
 Jabberjaw and Buford (both voiced by Frank Welker): Jabberjaw is still on his search for respect from his original series. His partner is Buford, from The Buford Files, where he's the lazy pet dog of two kids, Cindy Mae and Woody who solve mysteries in Fenokee County. Their race ship contains a track on which Buford runs to increase speed, which is seldom used since it is hard to keep him awake. Jabberjaw was once seen running on it during the episode "The Saturn 500".
 Nugget Nose (voiced by Frank Welker), Wendy (voiced by Marilyn Schreffler) and Rita (voiced by Pat Parris): The only racing team in the race that's a trio. They all are characters from The Galloping Ghost where Wendy and Rita work at the Fuddy Dude Ranch and Nugget Nose is a gold-obsessed ghost who's jealous about the girls. His nose looks like a nugget (hence the name).
 Captain Good/Phantom Phink and Clean Kat/Sinister Sludge (both voiced by Frank Welker): To the eyes of the other characters, Captain Good is the personification of good sportsmanship and fights for everything right. To the viewers, he's actually Phantom Phink, a space racer who uses all possible sorts of cheating like Dick Dastardly, except that he actually wins some races, crossing the finish line either as Captain Good or as Phantom Phink. The duo can transform themselves, and their car, at the touch of a button. Captain Good looks like a handsome white-clad and blond-tressed muscleman while Phink is a skinny costumed creep with a big nose and bristly black beard. Although Good/Phink never tricks people into believing they are seeing both of them at the same time and Phink never shows up for the start of any race, nobody suspects they're one and the same, not even the narrator. Good/Phink usually tries to get help from people who live in the planets where the races take place, no matter which identity he must use. Clean Kat/Sinister Sludge is Captain Good's/Phantom Phink's pet cat/dog. Clean Kat is a white and snobbish cat while Sinister Sludge is a sleazy brown dog who's usually told by Phink to shut up. Whenever Good/Phink morphs, Kat/Sludge morphs together (although he is capable of doing it separated from his master, such as in the Saturn 500, when Phink says dogs aren't allowed on Mars and he morphs, causing Phink to says cats aren't either and in the Mizar Marathon when Good said that cats aren't allowed in a castle, to which he morphs and Good says that goes for dogs too).
 The Narrator (voiced by Gary Owens): This unseen character is the narrator of the Space Race and presenter of the Space Race Biography. He sometimes talks to the characters of the series.
 El Fabuloso: The Space Race's official computer which often speaks in Spanish. It analyzes the races to catch any cheat practiced and often disqualifies Phantom Phink for cheating. Phink usually utilizes his alter-ego to proceed on the race because of that. In Franzia, after Good/Phink tricks the local version of The Hunchback of Notre Dame to stop the other racers, El Fabuloso finally discovers they're one and the same, but no one believes it and the narrator assumes El Fabuloso has a malfunction. To keep his secret identity, Phink has to convert into Captain Good to save the Space Racers.

Biography
The series often introduces the biography of some Space Racers or their ancestors. Phantom Phink was once described as a "descendant" of Dr. Jekyll, who was described looking like Captain Good while Mr. Hyde looks like Phink, giving us an idea of Good's/Phink's original look that contradicts the idea believed by many fans that Clean Kat/Sinister Sludge is originally a dog since this is his shape as Phantom Phink's pet and Sludge is the one to have a biography.

Episodes

Thirteen episodes were broadcast in 1978. The winners of each race got a prize which ended up unfortunate, such as having to do the dishes after their meal at the Ritz.

Voices
 Daws Butler . . . Yogi Bear, Huckleberry Hound, Quick Draw McGraw
 Joe Besser . . . Scare Bear
 Mel Blanc . . . Quack-Up, Barney Rubble
 Frank Welker . . . Jabberjaw, Buford, Nugget Nose, Captain Good/Phantom Phink, Clean Kat/Sinister Sludge
 Marilyn Schreffler . . . Wendy
 Pat Parris . . . Rita, Cindy Mae
 Dave Landsburg . . . Woody
 Henry Corden . . . Sheriff Muletrain, Fred Flintstone
 Roger Peltz . . . Deputy Goofer McGee
 Hal Peary . . . Fenwick Fuddy
 Bob Holt . . . Grape Ape
 John Stephenson . . . Captain Snerdley, General Blowhard
 Gary Owens . . . The Narrator

Additional voices

 Roger Behr
 Tony Caauso
 Ted Cassidy
 B.J. Cling
 Henry Corden
 Joan Gerber
 Virginia Gregg
 Bob Hastings
 Ralph James

 Casey Kasem
 Jim MacGeorge
 Ginny McSwain
 Don Messick
 Ronnie Schell
 Hal Smith
 Alexis Tramunti
 Janet Waldo
 Lennie Weinrib

See also

 List of works produced by Hanna-Barbera
 List of Hanna-Barbera characters
 Yogi Bear (character)
 The Yogi Bear Show
 Wacky Races
 Yogi's Gang
 Galaxy Goof-Ups
 Yogi's Treasure Hunt
 The New Yogi Bear Show
 Fender Bender 500
 Yo Yogi!

In other languages 
 French: Le Grand Prix Spacial de Yogi
 Italian: La corsa spaziale di Yoghi
 Spanish: Carrera Espacial de Yogi

References

External links
 Yogi's Space Race at The Big Cartoon DataBase
 

1978 American television series debuts
1979 American television series endings
1970s American animated television series
American animated television spin-offs
American children's animated space adventure television series
American children's animated comic science fiction television series
American children's animated sports television series
Animated television series about bears
Animated television series about dogs
Television series set in outer space
Television series set on fictional planets
Crossover animated television series
English-language television shows
Yogi Bear television series
Huckleberry Hound television series
NBC original programming
Television series by Hanna-Barbera